Fontaine Ndanu Julien Mutale Ngoy Bin Cibambi (born 2 November 1997), known as Julien Ngoy, is a Belgian professional footballer who plays as a forward for Mechelen.

Club career

Stoke City
Ngoy was born in Antwerp and began his football career playing in the youth team at Anderlecht up to the age of 14, he then spent two years with Club Brugge where his was top scorer of the under-16 team. In 2013, Ngoy decided to quit Brugge and join the NSeth Football Academy where he impressed the director, Nkandu Ntondo, who described him as the best talent he has seen at his academy. In the summer of 2013, Ngoy signed with English club Stoke City of the Premier League. In April 2014, he won the Generation Adidas Cup with Stoke City U17s.

Ngoy made his professional debut for Stoke in a 3–1 Premier League defeat at Arsenal on 10 December 2016. He made a total of six substitute appearances for Stoke in 2016–17. Ngoy was named as the Premier League 2 Player of the Month for March 2017. On 31 January 2018, Ngoy joined League One club Walsall on loan until the end of the 2017–18 season. He played 13 times for the Saddlers scoring three goals as they successfully avoided relegation.

On 29 August 2018, Ngoy joined Swiss Super League side Grasshoppers on loan until the end of the 2018–19 season. He was handed the number 20 shirt by the club. Ngoy played 23 times for Grasshoppers, scoring five goals in what was a traumatic season for the club who suffered relegation for the first time in 68 years and had a number of matches suspended due to fan protests. Ngoy struggled for game time in 2019–20, making only two brief substitute appearances.

Eupen
Ngoy joined Belgian First Division A side Eupen on 8 August 2020 on a two-year contract.

Mechelen
On 4 July 2022, Ngoy signed a three-year contract with Mechelen.

International career
He was a youth international for Belgium.

Personal life
Ngoy was born in Belgium and is of Congolese descent.

Career statistics

Honours
Individual
 Premier League 2 — Player of the Month: March 2017

References

External links
 
 

Living people
1997 births
Belgian people of Democratic Republic of the Congo descent
Belgian footballers
Footballers from Antwerp
Association football forwards
Belgium youth international footballers
Premier League players
English Football League players
Swiss Super League players
Belgian Pro League players
Stoke City F.C. players
Walsall F.C. players
K.A.S. Eupen players
Grasshopper Club Zürich players
K.V. Mechelen players
Belgian expatriate footballers
Expatriate footballers in England
Expatriate footballers in Switzerland
Belgian expatriate sportspeople in England
Belgian expatriate sportspeople in Switzerland